George Arthur Martin (26 January 1875 – 2 September 1943) was an Australian rules footballer who played for the Essendon Football Club in the Victorian Football League (VFL).

A ruckman, Martin was a dual premiership player at Essendon, playing in the inaugural VFL premiership side in 1897 and again in 1901. He was sacked from the club during the 1904 after a disagreement with the board and finished his career with Essendon Association in the Victorian Football Association (VFA).

References

Sources

Essendon Football Club profile

1875 births
1943 deaths
Essendon Football Club players
Essendon Association Football Club players
Essendon Football Club Premiership players
Australian rules footballers from Victoria (Australia)
Brunswick Football Club players
Two-time VFL/AFL Premiership players
People from Brunswick, Victoria